The Bucharest Marathon is an annual marathon and sport event hosted by the city of Bucharest, Romania since 2008.  It is organized by the Bucharest Running Club, and held during the second weekend of October.  The marathon is categorized as a Bronze Label Road Race by World Athletics.

History 

An annual marathon has been held in Bucharest as early as 1992.

The first edition of the most recent version of the annual marathon was first held in 2008.

In 2020, initially, the race was limited to 250 professional runners due to the coronavirus pandemic, with all other entries automatically transferred to 2021, and all such registrants given the option of also running the race virtually and receiving a medal for free.  However, the day before the scheduled date, the marathon was cancelled due to a request from the Ministry of Youth and Sport sent to the organizers the night before, in reaction to rising numbers of coronavirus cases within the capital.

Course 

The course then turns around and heads back to Parcul Izvor via Calea Victoriei. The course then heads southwest past Piața Constituției to run a loop on Șoseaua Panduri and Bulevardul Tudor Vladimirescu. After returning to Piața Constituției, the course heads east again on Bulevardul Unirii, with a turnaround at the roundabout at Piața Alba Iulia and then a long loop on Splaiul Unirii, before returning to a finish at Piața Constituției.

Other races 

The event also includes a half marathon, a 10K, and a marathon relay.  In addition, there are several races held the day before that are not electronically timed, including a  race, a race for teens also of length , and multiple races for kids.

Winners

Key: Course record

Notes

References

External links
Official website

2008 establishments in Romania
Annual sporting events in Romania
Autumn events in Romania
Marathons in Europe
October sporting events
Recurring sporting events established in 2008
Road running competitions in Romania
Sports competitions in Bucharest